Ronnie Calderon (born February 5, 1952) is an Israeli former professional footballer who played as a midfielder. He made nine appearances, scoring one goal for the Israel national team.

Honours
Hapoel Tel Aviv
 Israeli Championship: 1968–69
 AFC Youth Championship: 1971
 Israel State Cup: 1972

References

Israel National Team - Appearances and Goalscoring

1952 births
Living people
Israeli footballers
Association football defenders
Liga Leumit players
Hapoel Tel Aviv F.C. players
AFC Ajax players
Feyenoord players
Paris FC players
Hapoel Ramat Gan F.C. players
Eredivisie players
Ligue 1 players
Israel international footballers
Israeli expatriate footballers
Expatriate footballers in the Netherlands
Expatriate footballers in France
Israeli expatriate sportspeople in the Netherlands
Israeli expatriate sportspeople in France
Jewish Israeli sportspeople
Footballers from Tel Aviv